"Dine Øjne" is a single by Danish singer Jon Nørgaard, from his third studio album Uden dig. It was released in Denmark as a digital download on 7 March 2011. The song peaked at number 14 on the Danish Singles Chart.

Track listing
Digital download
 "Dine Øjne" - 5:23
 "Dine Øjne" (Radio Edit) - 4:27

Chart performance

Release history

References

2011 singles
Jon Nørgaard songs
2011 songs
Universal Music Group singles
Songs written by Jon Nørgaard